Shwe htamin is a traditional Burmese dessert or mont.

The dessert consists of glutinous rice cooked with pandan leaves, coconut milk, and jaggery, and garnished with fresh coconut shavings.

References

Burmese cuisine
Sesame dishes